East Dundry is a south-facing hamlet some 160 metres above sea level in a sheltered valley of Dundry Hill just south of Bristol, England. The hamlet is in the parish of Dundry and about two kilometres east of its village church. The iron-age Maes Knoll tump (2.5 kilometres to the east) and tumuli (in the field just north-east of North Hill Farm) are evidence of long occupation of the valley.

Wansdyke, strip lynchets
East Dundry's northern slope facing Bristol has supposedly a continuation westwards from Maes Knoll of the remains of Wansdyke, a series some 31 km-long of early medieval defensive linear earthworks consisting of a ditch and a running embankment from the ditch spoil, with the ditching facing north, to repel invasion from the north.

There are ancient downhill strip lynchets in the large field opposite North Hill Cottage; and mildly sloping ones in the top field opposite The Rookery.

The original settlements probably owed their existence to the quarrying of the local Dundry stone, which is found at Cardiff Castle and was used in mediaeval Bristol. Nearby Dundry originally had a Roman fort built as part of the local defences against by Anglo-Saxon invasions.

The hamlet today has some 16 houses including one active farm (mostly successful breeding turkeys): there were five active farms until the 1950s, two until the 1920s, all mostly supplying milk to Bristol. Most buildings are built from the oolitic limestone quarried locally, probably mostly by the sites of the houses. Until 1930, the inhabitants were almost entirely farmers and farm workers: gradually since then the hamlet has become a dormitory village for Bristol.

Access, bus service, postal service 
East Dundry Lane in the 1920s was the first to be tarred into the hamlet. Bristol, with its centre only 6 kilometres away, had mains water, electricity, gas, and dial telephones by the 1930s – but the Second World War and its ten years of ensuing austerity stopped all extension of these facilities to places such as East Dundry.

From 1923 until the 1950s there was a frequent Dundry Pioneer bus service from its Dundry terminus on the flat part of the Bristol-Wells road near the chapel at the top of Broad Oak Hill, into the then open-air bus-terminus in Prince Street in Bristol via Dundry village, the Hairpin Bend, Bishopsworth, and Bedminster.

Until the 1960s, letters were delivered on bicycles to East Dundry and all Dundry premises. The Dundry Post Office was a few houses south of the Carpenter's Arms pub and its north-side neighbour the smithy, all strategically in Cold Harbour on the Bristol-Wells stage-coach mail road. Later the post office was some 200 metres north west of Dundry church in a house on the north side of the road.

Second World War 
A week or so before war was declared, several London children were evacuated to East Dundry: for instance two were billeted to Spring Farm, two to The Dingle and some to The Rookery.

Later in the war, refugees from the bombing of Bristol stayed for instance in Spring Farm. Two land girls helped in Walnut Farm and two in Spring Farm.

Bombs and shrapnel fell in East Dundry: bombs fell in the bull pen of North Hill Farm on 3 January 1941. Incendiary bombs fell in the hamlet, for instance in the farmyard of Spring Farm. Two East Dundry men were responsible in a rota every night as fire watchers for the hamlet.

Electricity 
Negotiations with the Electricity Board started with a meeting in Walnut Farm in 1952, with installation in 1953 of an 11kV supply from across the valley in 1953.

Water supply

Wells
The houses and farms built before about 1890 (and dating back to mediaeval and earlier times) are all geologically close to the division between clay and the higher layer of Dundry hill's oolitic limestone  – this allowed wells to be sunk for them, with a reliable supply. Nearly all old East Dundry have wells.

Hydraulic rams
The farmhouses North Hill Farm and Walnut Farm were built in the late 19th century on the hamlet's higher and flatter land – more suitable than the steeper land of the original farms, such as Spring Farm and the farm that was at the current North Hill Cottage with its large flattish walled-garden that was its farm yard. These two higher farms installed separate hydraulic rams in the late 1800s and were served by them until the late 1950s. The farms needed ample water for their dairy herds prosperously supplying milk to Bristol by horse and cart.

North Hill Farm laid a 6-inch diameter, china-clay pipe (still visible in places in the steep nearby stream) from the spring below Upton Farm to a ram in a small stone hut on the south side of the valley-bottom stream. There remains a narrower metal pipe (crossing the stream and then all under the soil) up and through Nuthill field to North Hill Farm – much higher than the Upton Farm spring. The ram near the stream below Walnut Farm pumped water up to the farm. Upton farm also had (has?) a hidden, disused hydraulic ram near the same spring.

Day and night, the rams thumped every 20 seconds or so and were audible throughout East Dundry until the 1950s. Walnut Farm ran their ram well into the mid sixties with the ram feed water supply coming from an open topped limestone cistern built into the south side of the valley containing approximately 12 cubic metres of water bubbling up from an underground spring. The ram was housed in a small shed 40 metres into the base of the valley next to the stream with the waste wash from the ram flowing into it. The delivery pipe from the ram ran north up to a holding tank at the farm. Once a mains water supply was installed (1957/8) the water from the ram was used solely for livestock and washing down the yards. The rhythmic thumping of the ram had a shorter frequency than the one mentioned at North Hill Farm with gentle knocks about every 3 to 4 seconds.

Mains water
Water (pumped up Dundry hill from the small pumping station half-way up Broad Oak Hill road) was only supplied to the hamlet in 1957/8 after negotiations since 1952. Dundry village had mains water supplied years earlier than East Dundry.

Gas supply 
Gas was first supplied in the 1960s when a gas main to Chew Magna was routed through East Dundry passing up from Bristol along the track north of North Hill Farm, down the hamlet's lane to Cross Cottage, down in the field at the west end of Cross Cottage's garden, along the road past Spring Farm and up the track towards Rattledown Farm.  In a few years every joint of this relatively high-pressure-gas steel pipeline had to be resealed when the supply was converted from town to natural gas. Later the pipeline was reduced in pressure to minimise gas losses and only served East Dundry.

Telephones and data fibre 

East Dundry telephone subscribers were originally served by a network of poles and overhead open-wire cables all the way some 6 kilometres from the Chew Magna manual telephone exchange. Due to the Second World War and the following austerity, two houses often shared one of the few available lines with party lines (for example The Dingle had the number Chew Magna 81 from 1931 and the neighbouring North Hill Cottage later shared the line with Chew Magna 1081). In the late 1950s Bristol's automatic Strowger Bedminster exchange 66xxxx numbers served the hamlet, changing later to 63xxxx and yet later 963xxxx. Subscriber Trunk Dialling became available on 5 December 1958 to call a few UK cities. Bristol had the dialling code 0BR2 progressively changing to 0272 (the same on the dial as 0BR2), and then 0117 plus 7-digit Bristol numbers.

During the lead up to Christmas 1962 there were light falls of snow. Around Christmas Eve, after a slight thaw, freezing started again with significant snowfalls during Boxing Day, later to be known as ‘The Big Freeze of 1963’. The previously partially-melted light and fluffy snow formed dense solid ice on the thin copper telephone lines increasing their weight. This and fresh snowfalls stretched the copper wires until they reached the ground. The multiple overhead open-wire phone lines were after the winter replaced by a single multi-core cable suspended from the poles. A few years later the cable was buried in the fields north of East Dundry Lane and the poles removed.

A fibre link to East Dundry was made in the early 2020s underground west-to-east in the fields on the north side of East Dundry Lane, and distributed overhead to most of East Dundry properties.

Tithes 
The Tithe Acts of 1936 and 1951 established the compulsory redemption of English tithes by the state where the annual amounts payable were less than £1, so abolishing the bureaucracy and costs of collecting small sums of money. This applied to East Dundry as elsewhere.

Notable residents
The plant pathologist Lawrence Ogilvie lived in The Dingle (now Dingle House).
The sculptress Doris Kathleen Flinn lived in The Rookery.

References

External links
Parish website

Hamlets in Somerset